Miss Trans Global is an annual international pageant for transgender women. It claims to be the biggest international advocacy pageant for transgender women. The event broadcasts live on multiple social networking websites from London, England. It has gained traction for transgender advocacy, as well as raising awareness about queer culture and LGBT concerns, particularly in countries where transphobia and homophobia are prevalent. The pageant presents itself as a safe space for transgender women to share their lived experiences through speeches, talent shows, and art.

Mela Habijan of the Philippines won the first edition of Miss Trans Global in an event held virtually on September 12, 2020. Sruthy Sithara of India won the second edition; she is the first Indian transgender woman to win an international transgender pageant. The current winner is Natasha Cardoso of Brazil, who won the title on the 31st of November, 2022, in a digital event.

History 
The pageant was founded by Miss Sahhara, a transgender activist, and a beauty queen who was behind Queen of Nations, another pageant for transgender women that has been held in the United Kingdom for the past 13 years. According to Sahhara, she and her team thought of holding the 10th edition of Queen of Nations in 2017 online. Instead, they decided to launch a new title which is mainly geared towards transgender advocacy, education, and trans-empowerment through multiple digital platforms. They aimed to create an inclusive and accessible space for all transgender women from diverse backgrounds to express themselves on an international stage without leaving their homes or country.

According to Miss Sahhara, "Miss Trans Global was conceived in 2017 but realized during isolation in 2020. Our communities around the world are often either stuck at home with transphobic family members or homeless due to family rejection. Many of us are misunderstood at home and marginalized in society. Also, we have limited earning opportunities. So, we decided to help address some of these issues by engaging our online global community through the Miss Trans Global Digital Pageant".

The organizing team includes Sally Adams, a media and entertainment lawyer, Rica Paras, an information technology professional, and Imanni Da Silva, a model, artist, television presenter, and social activist

The exclusion of transgender contestants in pageantry 

In 2019, transgender pageant winner Anita Green filed a suit against Miss United States LLC on the grounds of gender identity discrimination. Green entered a franchise of Miss United States after participating in Miss Earth United States, but was refused entry because of the competition rule which states that only a 'natural born female''' is allowed to participate. A federal court dismissed a Green's discrimination case against the pageant.  

The court filing submitted by Miss United States constantly misgendered Green and used derogatory words to invalidate the complainant's gender identity. Miss United States also claims that allowing transgender women in their competition would "undermine its vision" and would undermine their "message of biological female empowerment." John T. Kaempf, the Miss United States pageant's lawyer praised the dismissal of Green's suit stating that the pageant "is not anti-transgender." "Miss United States wants to be able to hold a pageant that is only for biological females," he said the organisation "believes there can be a Miss Black USA pageant, a Miss Native American pageant, or a transgender pageant."

In an interview with KGW, Green said, "I compete in pageantry to show that there are many different types of beauty... To me, that rule was saying that transgender women aren't women, and that sends a very harmful message."

Unperturbed by the news of the dismissal of her case, Green said she is not giving up on her fight for justice for transgender women, and she is very proud of her achievement in raising awareness about the discrimination transgender women face in pageantry. "This case brought awareness to an issue many people were and still are unaware of," Green told Oregon Live, "and that issue is that discrimination against transgender people is still actively happening in the private and public sector even within the pageant circuit."

 The exclusion of transgender women from female only spaces 

Some transgender activists have affirmed that the exclusion of transgender women from female only spaces such as sports, pageants, and bathrooms has necessitated the creation of dedicated spaces for transgender people. Others argue that it may foster segregation. 

Sociologist and feminist campaigner Finn Mackay stated in an interview with The Guardian, that reducing womanhood to fertility and genitals trivialises the damage done by patriarchy influenced by politics when it comes to sexuality and gender. "They do it for ideological reasons, as part of a campaign for trans exclusion. When people turn round and say: 'This is a dog whistle' – of course it is! Otherwise, why would you be chatting about people's genitals?" Mackay asked.

 Recent success 

Miss USA, a franchise of Miss Universe, started allowing transgender women in their pageant in 2012. The pageant's first transgender state representative was Kataluna Enriquez, winner of Miss Nevada USA. Enriquez served as a judge in the first edition of Miss Trans Global.

 Goal 
The main premise of Miss Trans Global is to "revolutionize pageantry" by including transgender women in mainstream beauty pageantry, and to raise awareness for trans issues. Many of the contestants are also transgender rights activists. Their advocacies are heavily influenced by transphobic violence, including domestic violence, discrimination, and the murders of transgender women globally. An associate of the Miss Trans Global's team, Yunieski Carey Herrera, was murdered by her partner on November 17, 2020, in Miami, Florida. She was crowned Miss Trans Global in 2019.

 Advocacy 
According to the organisation, the top 5 winners of Miss Trans Global work as spokespersons on transgender and LGBT issues worldwide. They claim to work closely with activist organisations such as TransValid, TransBeauty Magazine, TransGriot, to educate cisgender people and inspire transgender people globally. The organisation started an initiative called 'For Trans Women by Trans Women, where a group of transgender women from different countries come together to raise awareness about issues that affect their local communities.

The organizers said that Miss Trans Global "is not about a beautiful face and perfect body" but rather "about activism, charity, and intelligence".

The pageant says the winners will serve as spokespeople "and work digitally to influence positive changes in our community internationally."

The pageant considers itself as a digital and physical space for transgender women from different backgrounds who are driven through activism to highlight the plight of LGBT people in their various countries. The participants share their lived experiences through the use of digital content production and publishing through the guidance of the organisation.

 Competition and selection of winners 

The organizers of the competition described it as "the future of international trans pageantry", because of its accessibility and ease of participation. The contestants execute the various tasks at home and submit videos to the judges. The winners are selected based on the scores given by the judges.

 Competition Format 
Contestants are given a creative challenge once a week. They film and produce a submission video in accordance with the rules and guidelines stipulated by the pageant directors. The judges then review their performances and score the contestants accordingly. 

 Judging 
The judges are seasoned female transgender activists and pageant queens who have fought for transgender rights in their various countries.

 Awards 
Miss Trans Global and its runner-up awards are the adaption of the female British nobility titles, namely:

 Queen Global, Miss Trans Global — Winner
 Duchess Global — First runner-up
 Marchioness Global — Second runner-up
 Countess Global — Third runner-up
 Baroness Global''' — Fourth runner-up

The organisation's definition of a queen is a transgender woman who uses their voice for the voiceless and someone who marries the ambition of helping marginalised transgender community that are often discriminated against due to misconceptions.

The inaugural event 
The inaugural competition, which took place on September 12, 2020, focused on transgender people suffering in isolation due to the COVID-19 pandemic. It included participants from countries around the world. Miss Mela Franco Habijan from the Philippines became the first ever winner of the competition, in a coronation ceremony streamed live on YouTube and Facebook.

The pageant's inaugural Judges were:

 Monica Roberts, a notable transgender rights advocate and journalist in the United States who passed away on October 5th , 2020, 
 Candi Stratton, a flight attendant, beauty queen, and transgender rights advocate
 Michelle Ross, founder-director of CliniQ Counselling and Wellbeing
 Kataluna Enriquez, Miss Nevada USA and fashion designer 
 Victoria Maxima Caram, Miss Trans Star International executive director
 Amanda Uzoma McQueens, founder of Friends in Diaspora for Friends in Africa

Titleholders

Gallery of Miss Trans Global 2020 winners

List of Runners-up

See also 

 List of beauty contests
 Miss Trans Star International
 Miss Continental
 Miss T World
 Super Sireyna Worldwide
 Miss Trans Israel
 Miss Trans Albania

References 

Beauty pageants
Transgender beauty pageants
Recurring events established in 2020
LGBT events in the United Kingdom
Virtual events
LGBT beauty pageants